The 2022 Big Sky Conference men's basketball tournament was the postseason tournament for the Big Sky Conference, held March 9–12 at Idaho Central Arena in Boise, Idaho. It was the 47th edition of the conference tourney, which debuted in 1976.

Top-seeded Montana State defeated third seed Northern Colorado 87–66 in the final and received the conference's automatic bid to the NCAA tournament. It was the Bobcats' first NCAA appearance in 26 years and their fourth overall.

Second seed Southern Utah lost its opener in their final Big Sky tournament; they joined the Western Athletic Conference (WAC) in the summer.

Seeds 
The eleven teams were seeded by conference record, with a tiebreaker system; the top five teams received a first-round bye.

Schedule

Bracket

References 

Tournament
Big Sky Conference men's basketball tournament
Big Sky Conference men's basketball tournament
Big Sky Conference men's basketball tournament
Basketball competitions in Boise, Idaho
College sports tournaments in Idaho